Hallward may refer to:

People
 Bertrand Hallward (1901–2003), British university administrator
 Gloria Hallward (1923–1981) (known as Gloria Grahame), American actress
 Peter Hallward, Canadian political philosopher
 Reginald Hallward (1858–1948), British glass artist

Other
 Basil Hallward, an artist in the novel The Picture of Dorian Gray by Oscar Wilde
 Hallward Library, the main library of the University of Nottingham, England, named after Bertrand Hallward